Mir Sadiq held the post of a minister in the cabinet of Tipu Sultan of Mysore. Due to his role in helping the British colonize India, and the eventual downfall of the state of Tipu Sultan, Mir Sadiq is reviled in the Indian subcontinent (Pakistan, India and Bangladesh) as a traitor. Today, his name has become synonymous with the word treason among the people of the region.

Fourth Anglo-Mysore War 
In the Fourth Anglo-Mysore War in 1798–99, he betrayed Tipu Sultan during the Siege of Srirangapatana, paving the way for a British victory. During the siege, although the invading English troops were starving, Mir Sadiq withdrew his troops, allowing the British to commence their attack on the fort. He betrayed Tipu, killing Tipu loyalist Ghazi Khan and later arranged to have Tipu trapped behind locked doors. Sadiq was killed by some of the dismayed Mysorean troops immediately following the defeat as he attempted to go over to welcome the British.

Death and legacy 
Following his death, Sadiq's body was mutilated, exhumed and defiled for over two weeks by the angered general public, including women and children, dismayed at his betrayal of Tipu Sultan, forcing the administration to impose "strong measures". Even today, tourists pelt the spot where Mir Sadiq was killed. 

Mir Sadiq's mausoleum, also located in Srirangapatna, has regularly been assaulted by shoes thrown by visitors over the years. Presently, it is in a severe state of disrepair, rarely visited,  and its lands have been encroached. 

Muhammad Iqbal, the notable poet of Indian subcontinent, had condemned Mir Jafar and Mir Sadiq as follows:

"Jaffar az Bengal, o Sadiq az Deccan

Nang–e–Adam, Nang–e–Deen, Nange–Watan"

(Mir Jaffar of Bengal and Mir Sadiq of Deccan, are a disgrace to mankind, and their religion and country!)

See also
 Mir Jafar

References 

1799 deaths
Indian Shia Muslims
Wars involving the Kingdom of Mysore
Year of birth unknown
Traitors in history